Abubakar Baker Shariff-Farr (born 12 February 1994), better known as Bakar, is a British singer. Known for his experimental indie rock style, he made his professional solo debut with the mixtape Badkid in May 2018, subsequently releasing the extended play Will You Be My Yellow? in September 2019. He released his debut album Nobody's Home in February 2022.

Early life 
Bakar grew up in Camden in North London and attended a state school before being sent to a boarding school in Surrey by his mother. He is of Yemeni and Tanzanian descent. He expressed that "going outside of London and hearing other tastes and how that can relate to [him], it definitely did something to [him]."

Career

2015–2017: Online beginnings and solo debut 
Bakar began creating music in 2015 by cutting up samples of Bombay Bicycle Club and King Krule songs and uploading them to an anonymous SoundCloud account. For the next few years, he continuously uploaded projects and works to the platform, several of which are no longer available.

Bakar officially independently released his debut single, "Big Dreams" in March 2017. In 2018, the song later gained popularity after being featured on the official soundtrack of the video game FIFA 19. Bakar performed the song "Scott Free" on the online German music series ColorsxStudios in March 2017, where it has amassed over 300 thousand views . Before the end of 2017, Bakar had self-released the non-album singles "Small Town Girl" and "Something I Said".

2018: Badkid 
In early 2018, Bakar released the single "Million Miles" and announced the his debut full length project, Badkid. In April 2018, he released the project's third single, "All In", following the lead single "Big Dreams" (2017) and "Million Miles" (2018). Bakar performed at Live at Leeds in May 2018, where he was described by NME as an "electrifying performer" who "cemented himself as one of Britain's most exciting new acts". He released "Badlands" as the final single off of Badkid a week later. Bakar's performance set at The Great Escape in May 2018 was also well received by critics. Badkid was released as a mixtape under Bakar's own record label,*bash, on 22 May 2018. He marked the release of the mixtape with a headlining performance at Camden Assembly in London. He announced a headlining tour of the United Kingdom including a performance at The Dome in London. After completing the sold out tour, Bakar released the non-album single "Dracula" in October 2018.

2019–2020: Will You Be My Yellow? 
Bakar signed to both Black Butter Records and September Management in early 2019. In January 2019, American rapper Sheck Wes mentioned a future collaboration with Bakar. In March 2019, Bakar released the non-album single set "Chill" and "Sold Your Soul" alongside the announcement of another headlining European tour, Bakar & The Badkids. In August 2019, Bakar announced the release of the EP, Will You Be My Yellow?, and released its lead single "Hell n Back". The single became a sleeper hit in the United States, experiencing the longest trip to No. 1 on the Triple A chart in Billboard chart history, eventually peaking on 30 June 2020 (its 27th week). "Hell n Back" was also certified Gold in Australia in 2020. The six-track EP Will You Be My Yellow? was released to critical acclaim under Black Butter Records on 20 September 2019. The project was written and recorded within just eight weeks, and was produced by frequent collaborators Zach Nahome and Matty Tavares. It featured the track "Stop Selling Her Drugs" featuring American musician Dominic Fike.

In November 2019, Bakar performed "Hell n Back" for his second performance on the German music series ColorsxStudios, following his first performance "Scott Free" in March 2017. The former was released commercially as a non-album single and has amassed over one million views on YouTube . In November 2019, British singer Collard released the single "Stone" featuring Bakar. In December 2019, the song "Hell n Back" was used in the promotional ad for Arsenal F.C. x Adidas's Bruised Banana range, highlighting the lyric "Will you be my yellow?" which Bakar sings in the video.

2020–present: Hell n Back 
In January 2020, the song "Hell n Back" placed No. 62 on triple j's Hottest 100 of 2019. In February 2020, Bakar performed "Circles" by Mac Miller on BBC Radio 1Xtra as a tribute to the late rapper. Bakar was featured alongside American producer Kenny Beats on New Zealand singer Benee's single "Night Garden".

"Hell n Back" was the featured song in the teaser trailer for the upcoming Pixar film Elemental.

Bakar was featured on The Tonight Show Starring Jimmy Fallon in 2021, performing "The Mission".

Artistry and other ventures 
Musical influences cited by Bakar include Madlib and Foals. He has described his music as "schizophrenic", and said that he attempts to "bridge the gap" between different music genres. Ones to Watch described his style as a "melting pot of indie, rap, rock, and punk".

Bakar also modelled as part of Virgil Abloh's debut runway show for Louis Vuitton In June 2018 and then again in February 2019. In November 2019, he modelled for Prada's "A Gift to Give" campaign alongside models Pixie Geldof and Sara Blomqvist.

Reception 
Joe Goggins of DIY compared Bakar's vocal style to that of Kele Okereke from Bloc Party. Alex McFayden of Clash also compared his sound to that of Bloc Party. Ashleigh Kane of Crack Magazine deemed him as "indie's revivalist". Bakar's style has been noted as a progressive shift from the 'stale' sound of British rock in the late 2010s. Bakar has received endorsements from artists like Skepta, Elton John and fashion designer Virgil Abloh.

Discography

Studio albums

Mixtapes 
 Badkid (2018)

Extended plays 
 Will You Be My Yellow? (2019)

Singles

As lead artist

As featured artist

Guest appearances

SoundCloud releases 
 Happy BDay To Me - EP (2015)
 "Little Secret" - Single (2016)
 "Sharing is Caring" - Single (2016)
 "Best For You" - Single (2017)
 "New Day" - Single (2017)
 "i-D" - Single (2020)

References

Living people
1994 births
21st-century Black British male singers
Black Butter Records artists
British alternative rock musicians
British indie rock musicians
English experimental musicians
English male singer-songwriters
English people of Tanzanian descent
English people of Yemeni descent
Experimental pop musicians
People from Camden Town
Singers from London